Lacinipolia incurva is a species of moth in the family Noctuidae (owlet moths). It was described by John B. Smith in 1888 and is found in North America, where it has been recorded from California, Arizona, New Mexico, Texas, Utah and Colorado.

The wingspan is about 25 mm. Adults are similar to Lacinipolia anguina, but the hindwings are lighter and the median area of the forewings is nearly concolorous with rest of the wing.

The larvae have been recorded feeding on dead leaves of Quercus hypoleucoides.

The MONA or Hodges number for Lacinipolia incurva is 10373.

References

Further reading
 Arnett, Ross H. (2000). American Insects: A Handbook of the Insects of America North of Mexico. CRC Press.
 Lafontaine, J. Donald & Schmidt, B. Christian (2010). "Annotated check list of the Noctuoidea (Insecta, Lepidoptera) of North America north of Mexico". ZooKeys, vol. 40, 1-239.

External links
Butterflies and Moths of North America

Noctuinae
Moths described in 1888